Graeme Ormiston is a professional rugby union referee who represents the Scottish Rugby Union.

Rugby union career

Referee career

Professional career

Ormiston is a referee on the Borders Rugby Referees Society.

He has refereed in the Scottish Premiership.

Ormiston refereed his first Super 6 match on 14 December 2019 between Heriot's Rugby and Southern Knights.

He is now part of the SRU Premier Referee Panel.

He has refereed in the Kings of the Sevens tournament.

Ormiston has been Assistant Referee in the European Challenge Cup.

Ormiston has been Assistant Referee in the Pro14.

International career

He was named as an official in the 2019 Rugby World Cup.

He was Assistant Referee in the Romania v Belgium match on 10 March 2018 in the 2018 Rugby Europe Championship.

He was Assistant Referee in the Russia v Spain match on 10 March 2019 in the 2019 Rugby Europe Championship.

Cricket career

He was registered as a player for Gala Cricket club.

References

Living people
Scottish rugby union referees
Rugby union officials
Super 6 referees
Year of birth missing (living people)